American Cooperative School may refer to:

 American Cooperative School of La Paz
 American Cooperative School of Tunis

See also

 
 American (disambiguation)
 American School (disambiguation)
 Cooperative School (disambiguation)
 Cooperative (disambiguation)
 School (disambiguation)